Raylinos Joaquin 'Reily' Legito (born  July 26, 1978 in Curaçao, Netherlands Antilles) is a retired Dutch baseball player.

Legito, a right-handed infielder, represented the Netherlands at the 2000 Summer Olympics in Sydney where he and his team became fifth. Four years later at the 2004 Summer Olympics in Athens they were sixth.

Legito played his last game on 8 October 2016, winning his ninth championship with DOOR Neptunus.

References

External links
Legito at the Dutch Olympic Archive

1978 births
Baseball players at the 2000 Summer Olympics
Baseball players at the 2004 Summer Olympics
Baseball players at the 2008 Summer Olympics
Curaçao baseball players
Dutch people of Curaçao descent
Living people
Olympic baseball players of the Netherlands
Dutch baseball players
Curacao Neptunus players
DOOR Neptunus players
L&D Amsterdam Pirates players